Tower 28 is one of the tallest skyscrapers in New York City, located in the Long Island City neighborhood of Queens. It is the tallest residential building in Queens and the tallest residential building in New York City outside of Manhattan. 

The building includes around 450 residential units. The building has an observation deck on the 60th floor.

In 2019, the developer secured a $215 million loan from Morgan Stanley, replacing a $154 million construction loan from PNC Bank.

See also
 List of tallest buildings in New York City
 List of tallest buildings in Queens

References

External links
 

Skyscrapers in Queens, New York
Long Island City
Residential buildings completed in 2017
2017 establishments in New York City